is a subway station on the Toei Ōedo Line in Nerima, Tokyo, Japan, operated by Tokyo subway operator Toei Subway.

Lines
Hikarigaoka Station is the terminus of the Toei Ōedo Line. It is numbered E-38.

Station layout
The station is the westernmost of all Toei stations, and, at a depth of 11.9 m below ground level, the platform is the closest to the surface of all the Ōedo Line stations. There are five exits from the station, labelled A1 through to A5.

Platforms
The station has an island platform with two tracks.

History
Hikarigaoka Station opened on 10 December 1991.

Passenger statistics
In fiscal 2011, the station was used by an average of 56,529 passengers (28,347 boarding, 28,182 exiting) daily. Below is a table of the passenger statistics of the station beginning with 1991, the year the station entered service.

Surrounding area
The station is located towards the centre of the Hikarigaoka housing complex and is located in the vicinity of the large Hikarigaoka IMA shopping centre. Hikarigaoka itself is located at the northern point of Nerima, Tokyo near the border with Itabashi, Tokyo and Wakō, Saitama. Bus services from this station are operated by Kokusaikōgyō Bus and Seibu Bus. A spur of National Route 443 is routed above the station.

Cultural references
The station and other parts of the Toei Ōedo Line are referenced in the Digimon Adventure franchise.

See also
 List of railway stations in Japan

References

External links

  

Railway stations in Tokyo
Stations of Tokyo Metropolitan Bureau of Transportation
Toei Ōedo Line
Railway stations in Japan opened in 1991